The Star Screen Award Jodi No. 1 was first introduced in 2001. The award goes to a pair that have stood out and been appreciated by the Indian audience. Unlike the other awards this one is chosen by the viewers. The winner is announced in January. Most Jodi awards have been won by Shahrukh Khan with 7 wins. In actresses, Kajol, Rani Mukherji, Aishwarya Rai and Priyanka Chopra are the forerunners with 2 wins each.

Winners

References

See also
 Screen Awards
 Bollywood
 Cinema of India

Screen Awards